The concepts and structures of Jewish Kabbalah have been used in the contemporary world to open comparative dialogue and cross-fertilization with modern secular disciplines in the Sciences and Humanities. This has been an uncommon phenomenon, since it requires wide internal understanding of both traditionalist Kabbalah and modern secular thought, and for social reasons Jewish modernity has seen isolation and entrenchment between the two. Skilled authorities in both traditions have included contemporary traditionalist Orthodox teachers of Kabbalah, as well as Neo-Kabbalistic and Academic scholars who read Kabbalah in a critical, universalist way.

Traditional Kabbalistic views of the material world and the "lower wisdoms" deriving from it have been ambivalent, in comparison to the "higher wisdom" of Torah. While the physical world is a realm where impurity predominates and Divinity is hidden, the messianic aim sees the union of lower and higher wisdoms as a prerequisite for redemption and the absolute revelation of God. As generations progress to future redemption, the sparks of divinity in lower wisdoms become clarified as the sciences and humanities mature, deepen and ascend towards their eschatological union with the higher Divine wisdoms. Deriving from the physical world of plurality, the sciences and humanities represent partial perspectives on Reality, divorced from the unified Divine view of Kabbalah. They overcome rigid dogmas by discovering within themselves paradox, self-limitations, and shared perspectives. Concomitantly, the higher wisdom of Kabbalah progressively descends, becoming cumulatively more revealed, and is clarified by drawing from analogies developed by the lower wisdoms. The marriage between the two heals the pre-messianic division of "waters" (wisdoms) expressed in Genesis 1:7 "And God made the firmament, dividing the waters which were under the firmament from the waters which were above the firmament".

Traditional separatist Haredi believers in Kabbalah view engagement with secular thought as dangerous for those not qualified, but redemptive for those sages who can clarify unity, especially with the Exact Sciences. Enriching dialogue between Kabbalah and secular wisdoms is possible with the rise of modern and postmodern deepening ideas in the Sciences and Humanities, though the Humanities related to historical criticism in Religious studies determine the main threat to traditionalist views of Revelation, and the development of modern Jewish denominations. In contrast Neo-Kabbalistic approaches welcome views of Revelation compatible with the critical perspectives of Modernist or Open Orthodoxy, Jewish feminism, and Non-Orthodox Judaisms.

Among Kabbalists at the eve of modernity, the Vilna Gaon (18th century) foresaw the unfolding messianic Kabbalistic redemption of Sciences. In the early 20th century, Abraham Isaac Kook expressed a mystical process where the secular unconsciously deepens the sacred. The present generation has seen the proliferation of syntheses between Kabbalah and secular wisdoms, driven by Jewish outreach, traditional and Neo-Hasidic spirituality, publication of esoteric mystical works, deep involvement in both Jewish and secular cultures, revisionist ideas compatible with mysticism in secular wisdoms, and contemporary flourishing of new scholarship and perspectives by Jewish mystical academia.

Kabbalistic views

Harmonisation or opposition

Traditionalist Kabbalah and its development in Hasidic Judaism often took negative views of secular wisdoms. While some historical Kabbalists were learned in the canon of medieval Jewish philosophy, and occasionally mathematics and sciences, its relationship to medieval Jewish philosophy (built on Ancient Greek science and cosmology) was ambiguous. Kabbalistic dissemination began in the 12th century in order to stem the rationalist influence of Maimonides, in the context of controversies over his teachings. Nonetheless, philosophical terminology from Jewish philosophy, both Neoplatonic and Aristotelian, permeated the systems of Kabbalists, reinterpreted in mystical ways. The Kabbalistic dictum that "Kabbalah begins where philosophy ends" expressed their claim to superior knowledge, but can also be read as an appreciation of the foundations laid by Jewish philosophy. Kabbalaists held they could see further, giving mythological and psychological answers to philosophical questions, but by virtue of benefiting from the shoulders of philosophy. Kabbalists were certainly opposed to a dogmatic rationalism, but mystics such as the systemiser Moses Cordovero (16th century) expressed their influence from, and appreciation for, the profound philosophical purification of Jewish theology from mistaken corporeal interpretations universally established by Maimonides, in Cordovero's dialectical use of imagination to grasp then reject anthropomorphic conceptions in Kabbalah. Judah Loew ben Bezalel (16th century) expressed mystical ideas in the philosophical and scientific terminology of his day, appreciating the natural sciences if subservient to revelation.

Kabbalistic views on secular studies were shaped by both mystical views and social context. Shneur Zalman of Liadi (18th century) expresses the dangers of impure secular wisdoms to common faith, yet also the concealed divinity within them for great sages like the philosophical Maimonides (12th century) and mystical Nachmanides (13th century), who can clarify their unity with Torah, disclosing new esoteric dimensions:

Pre-Messianic era

Kabbalah (such as Nachmanides' commentary on the Torah) relates the 7 Days of Creation in Genesis chapter 1 to the 7 lower sephirot Divine attributes from Chesed to Malkuth. These comprise the "Revealed World" of Divine emotional expression, contrasted with the first 3 sephirot "Hidden World" of the Divine mind. The Talmud relates the 6 Days when God actively creates to the 6000 years of Creation, in the traditional Jewish calendar, with the 7th day corresponding to the messianic era 1000 years of Sabbath rest.

The Zohar central text of Kabbalah (disseminated 13th-15th centuries CE) commenting on the verse "In the six hundredth year of Noah's life, on the seventeenth day of the second month, on that day all the springs of the great deep burst forth, and the floodgates of the heavens were opened" (Genesis 7:11), relates that in the 600th year (or 600 years-6th century, 500-600) of the 6th millennium, the floodgates of wisdom above and below will open up, to prepare the world for the messianic age:

Within the pre-messianic 6th millennium, leading up to the 6th century individual gates of the "50 gates of wisdom" will open sequentially, but from the year 600 (1840 CE in the secular calendar) all gates will open, enabling the cumulative discovery from then on of the upper and lower wisdoms which will flood the world, preparing it for the revelation of Absolute Divine Unity in the 7th millennium. This will especially take place in the last generation of the messiah, when "even young children will know the secrets of the Torah". This mystical prediction corresponds to the early advent of modernist secular thought from 1740s-1840s on, that broke the conventions, rigidities and limits of early modern thought. Among new ideas since then, some are overtly compatible with traditional Kabbalistic mysticism, some are compatible with extending non-fundamentalist Neo-Kabbalistic views of Revelation, some await deeper clarification of their divine unity with Torah. Among new ideas that overtly lend themselves to unity with Kabbalistic ideas, examples include Hegelian dialectics (early 1800s), Quantum mechanics (early 1900s), Freudian and Jungian depth psychology (early 1900s), postmodern Deconstruction (late 1900s), String theory (late 1900s).

Biological Evolution (developed since the 1860s from the foundations of Darwin and Mendel), while providing the basis of contemporary New Atheism, has been studied as potentially valid "fallen" aspects of Divinity by the traditional Kabbalist Yitzchak Ginsburgh. Atheist views such as Nietzsche's (late 1800s) have been welcomed by the Orthodox mystic Abraham Isaac Kook and Neo-Kabbalist scholar Sanford Drob as a necessary refining dialectical pole in Kabbalah's human-divine Panentheism view of God. The secular documentary criticism of the Torah (1700s on), and feminist criticisms are being discussed in Open Orthodox and Non-Orthodox Judaisms as outlooks that can expand evolving human understanding of Kabbalah's transcendent Mystical Torah.

The prediction of the Zohar states that in (or from) the years 1740-1840 CE (or the year 1840), both the "lower (human) wisdoms" of secular thought and the "higher (divine) wisdoms" of Kabbalah will open. The dissemination of the higher wisdoms today can be found in the contemporary flourishing of Jewish mysticism academia since the mid-20th century, who have catalogued, published and interpreted historical Kabbalistic texts, offering perceptive historical, phenomenological and comparative scholarly new understandings of formerly unpublished and esoteric manuscripts, development of thought, and mystical techniques. This disclosure is ongoing, as is the proliferation of Judaic Kabbalah in Jewish outreach. The source of the divine wisdoms from the era 1740-1840 is attributed among Non-Hasidic Lithuanian Jews to the esoteric messianic Kabbalistic school of the Vilna Gaon (1720-1797) that esoterically prepared the ongoing "Messiah ben Joseph" union of Kabbalah and Science, and the publication of early texts of Kabbalah. Among Hasidic Judaism, the new dimensions of "upper wisdoms" are Hasidic thought, initiated by the Baal Shem Tov from the 1730s and developing its classic schools by the mid-1800s, which related transcendent Kabbalah to the psychological inner divine experience of man. In Chabad intellectual school of Hasidism, Hasidic thought is a new level of Divine revelation above Kabbalah and the concepts and structures of Torah thought. The Pardes 4 levels of Torah interpretation correspond to the Four Worlds and ascending levels of the soul, with Kabbalah corresponding to Atzilut, Divine revelation, Wisdom and the transcendent soul. Hasidic thought corresponds to the Yechida essence of the soul, innermost Divine Delight rooted in the Atzmus Divine Essence, the essence of the Torah, and the messianic essence of the world. As essence permeates and unites all other levels of Torah, so Hasidism finds expression in both Kabbalah and materiality, esoteric and exoteric. By revealing the common Divine Essence within both spiritual and physical, Hasidic thought through its conceptual articulation in Chabad, is a foretaste of the messianic era. In Breslav Hasidism, Nachman of Breslov saw himself as the next revelation of Kabbalah succeeding and encompassing the revelations of Isaac Luria and the Baal Shem Tov. The Lubavitcher Rebbe quotes the midrash that "God looked into the Torah and created the World", saying that it is the new revelations of the divine "upper wisdoms" in this period that cause the "lower wisdoms" of secular thought, science and technology to also be opened.

Traditionalist Kabbalah versus Neo-Kabbalah

Traditionalist Kabbalah embraces a Mosaic authorship fundamentalist view of Torah revelation, and the revelatory early origins of Jewish mysticism such as the Zohar. While rooting all creation and every individual entity in Absolute Divine origin, traditional Kabbalists also usually held a metaphysical particularist distinction in revealed Divinity between the souls of Jews and gentiles, concealed deep within the different forms of "divine spark" animating each. This view was bolstered in Kabbalist belief by the history of antisemitism until The Holocaust, replaced by antisemitism in Islam since the founding of the State of Israel. Traditionalist Kabbalah and modernist Neo-Kabbalistic adaptions represent two divergent directions in interpreting historical texts from Jewish mysticism. Traditional Kabbalists don't historically recognise the validity of Bible Criticism, or critical adaptions of Kabbalistic ideas to secular ideologies. Nonetheless, contemporary traditional Kabbalists who understand secular thought can see a true Divine element animating what to them are mistaken critical views of Torah.

Neo-Kabbalists, such as Neo-Hasidism, adapt Kabbalah and Hasidism to modern critical thought. They see positive benefit in the development of historical Kabbalah and Judaism to contemporary concerns, while retaining the spirituality of Jewish tradition and observance. They find fundamentalist and particularist notions problematic, welcoming non-fundamentalist views of Revelation in Judaism, and critical scholarship on the Biblical, Talmudic and mystical texts, including a late dating for the Zohar. Associated elements of historical Kabbalah, such as the numerical permutations of Torah text are downplayed, while new expressions and comparisons for Jewish mysticism are explored. They universalise the teachings of Kabbalah, translating Jewish Divine perception expressed through the spirituality of Jewish observance, into a personal existentialist spirituality. For Neo-Kabbalists, the problematic metaphysics differentiating Jews and gentiles dissolves in the antinomian boundaries to limited conceptions of Divinity highlighted in classic Kabbalistic hermeneutical implications of Infinite Divinity, expressed in the Zohar and other texts.

Scholars

Vilna Gaon

Rav Kook

Yitzchak Ginsburgh

Sanford Drob

Joel Bakst

Philip Berg

Topics

Mathematics

Physics

Cosmology

Evolutionary Biology

Philosophy

Depth Psychology

Literary criticism

Neo-Kabbalistic approaches to Bible Criticism

See also
Torah Umadda
Jewish views on evolution
Jewish reactions to intelligent design
Relationship between religion and science
Year 6000

Notes

Publications

 The Secret Doctrine of the Gaon of Vilna: Mashiach ben Yoseph and the Messianic Role of Torah, Kabbalah and Science (Volume 1), Joel David Bakst, City of Luz 2013
 The Secret Doctrine of the Gaon of Vilna: The Josephic Messiah, Leviathan, Metatron & the Sacred Serpent (Volume 2), Joel David Bakst, City of Luz 2013
 Beyond Kabbalah - The Teachings That Cannot Be Taught: Preparing for the Messianic Era and Beyond, Joel David Bakst, CreateSpace 2014
 The Spiritual Revolution of Rav Kook, Ari Ze'ev Schwartz, Gefen 2018
 Wisdom: Integrating Torah and Science, Yitzchak Ginsburgh and Moshe Genuth, Gal Einai publications 2018
 The Torah Academy, Yitzchak Ginsburgh, Gal Einai publications 1995
 Lectures on Torah and Modern Physics, Yitzchak Ginsburgh, Gal Einai publications 2013
 The Breath of Life: Torah, Intelligent Design and Evolution, Yitzchak Ginsburgh, Gal Einai publications 2018
 Transforming Darkness Into Light: Kabbalah and Psychology, Yitzchak Ginsburgh, Gal Einai publications 2005
 Symbols of the Kabbalah: Philosophical and Psychological Perspectives, Sanford Drob, Aronson 1999
 Kabbalistic Metaphors: Jewish Mystical Themes in Ancient and Modern Thought, Sanford Drob, Aronson 2000
 Kabbalah and Postmodernism: A Dialogue, Sanford Drob, Peter Lang publishers 2008
 Kabbalistic Visions: C.G. Jung and Jewish Mysticism, Sanford Drob, Spring Journal 2009
 The Hidden Freud: His Hassidic Roots, Joseph Berke, Routledge 2018
 Expanding the Palace of Torah: Orthodoxy and Feminism, Tamar Ross, Brandeis 2004
 Kabbalah and Criticism, Harold Bloom, Bloomsbury 2005
 Old Worlds, New Mirrors: On Jewish Mysticism and Twentieth-Century Thought, Moshe Idel, University of Pennsylvania press 2012

External links
Torah and Science Main Index on Yitzchak Ginsburgh's inner.org
Site entry of Sanford Drob's newkabbalah.com
Site entry of Joel David Bakst's cityofluz.com

Kabbalah
Jewish theology
Judaism and society
Judaism and science